Ahvenisto Race Circuit is a motor racing circuit located in Hämeenlinna, Finland.
Its elevation changes, short or sometimes inexistent run-off areas, and numerous fast bends have led to some to suggest that it is the hardest and most dangerous race track in Finland, or even one of the most challenging in the world.

History

The construction of Ahvenisto Race Circuit was finished on July 15, 1967. The same year, "I Hämeenlinnan ajot 1967" became the first international event to be held at the circuit. The Formula Two race was won by Jochen Rindt in a Brabham BT23 ahead of Jack Brabham's Brabham BT23C and Jim Clark's Lotus 48. The Formula Three race saw a battle between Finnish and Swedish drivers, with Sweden's Freddy Kottulinsky taking the win. Other notable entrants included Leo Kinnunen, Ronnie Peterson and Reine Wisell.

I Hämeenlinnan ajot 1967

Sports car and single-seater racing is however, not the only form of motorsport that Ahvenisto has hosted over the years. Notably, the 1960s and 1970s saw road racing events such as the FIM Formula 750 held at the circuit, and between 1980 and 1999 a total of 18 FIA European Rallycross Championship events were organized on a modified, mixed-surface version of the circuit, with some of the run-offs converted into gravel sections. In May 1984, what remains today the most severe helicopter accident in the history of Finland occurred at the track during a race. The pilot lost control of his helicopter while landing and crashed into an audience area, resulting in five spectators dead and 26 injured. The track reached its crowd record in 1985, when over 40,000 people arrived to watch Tähtien kisat ("The Race of Stars"), in which both Formula 1 and World Rally Championship stars from around the world, including Nelson Piquet, Keke Rosberg, Timo Salonen and Michele Mouton, gathered at Ahvenisto to race in identical and near-standard BMW cars. Currently, the track mostly hosts races in national and Nordic championships and cups, including Finnish Touring Car Championship, NEZ Racing Championship, Nordic Supercar, Finnish Rallycross Championship and Historic Race Finland.

Lap records

While the official lap record stands at 1:13.226 and was achieved by Marko Nevalainen in a Formula Three car on September 16, 2000, the 1982 Formula One World Champion Keke Rosberg managed an unofficial lap record of 1:10.000 during his 1984 show run in a Williams FW08C Formula 1 car. Meanwhile, two-time Formula One world champion Mika Häkkinen briefly held the lap record for the Porsche Carrera Cup class, recording a time of 1:19.905 during his visit to Ahvenisto on May 29, 2004 in a Porsche 911 GT3, but was surpassed by a 1:18.923 from Fredrik Ros the following year.

The fastest official race lap records at the Ahvenisto Race Circuit are listed as:

References

External links

Fansite

Motorsport venues in Finland
Sports venues completed in 1967
1967 establishments in Finland